This list is of the Historic Sites of Japan located within the Prefecture of Wakayama.

National Historic Sites
As of 17 June 2022, thirty-one Sites have been designated as being of national significance (including one *Special Historic Site); Kumano Sanzan spans the prefectural borders with Mie, Ōmine Okugakemichi spans the prefectural borders with Nara, and Kumano Sankeimichi spans the prefectural borders with both Mie and Nara.

Prefectural Historic Sites
As of 1 April 2022, one hundred and one Sites have been designated as being of prefectural importance.

Municipal Historic Sites
As of 1 May 2021, two hundred and five Sites have been designated as being of municipal importance.

See also

 Cultural Properties of Japan
 Wakayama Prefectural Museum
 Kii Province
 List of Cultural Properties of Japan - historical materials (Wakayama)
 List of Cultural Properties of Japan - archaeological materials (Wakayama)

References

External links
  Cultural Properties of Wakayama Prefecture
  Wakayama Cultural Heritage Guide

Wakayama Prefecture
 Wakayama